The Ostola is a 25 km long stream in the Piedmont region of north-western Italy. It's a left side tributary of the Cervo which flows through the Province of Biella.

Geography 

The Ostola source is on the southern slopes of Monte Capoposto (750 m), in the eastern and hilly part of the Alpi Biellesi, from which it flows through the communes of  Soprana, Mezzana Mortigliengo and Casapinta. In the territory of Masserano it receives the waters of Torrente Cigliaga and is blocked by a dam forming the artificial lake "delle Piane".  Flowing southwards the Ostola receives from the left side its mayor tributary, the Bisingana. It then enters the Po plain and near Castelletto Cervo  it flows into the river Cervo.

References

Other projects

Rivers of the Province of Biella
Rivers of the Alps
Rivers of Italy